Tariq Sheikh (born 11 December 1968) is a field hockey player who remained a member of Pakistan National Hockey Team from 1983 to 1991. He was born at Sialkot. He is cousin of Shahnaz Sheikh and nephew of Zahid Sheikh . He played 1990 7th Hockey World Cup at Lahore and was silver medallist. He also played 1988 Seoul Olympics, 1988 Champions Trophy, Asian Games , Asia Cup and Azlan Shah. He is one of the best forward in field hockey.

In June 2010 he was appointed as an assistant coach of the Pakistan under-16 hockey team.

References

External links
 

1968 births
Living people
Pakistani male field hockey players
Field hockey players from Sialkot
Olympic field hockey players of Pakistan
Field hockey players at the 1988 Summer Olympics
20th-century Pakistani people